Trausti is an Icelandic given name and also serves as a patronymic. It may refer to:

Given name
Trausti Eyjólfsson (1927–2010), Icelandic sprinter
Trausti Stefánsson (born 1985), Icelandic sprinter

Middle name
Ásgeir Trausti (born 1992), Icelandic singer-songwriter and musician
Ari Trausti Guðmundsson (born 1948), Icelandic geologist, author, documentarian, broadcaster, journalist, lecturer, mountaineer and explorer
Jón Trausti Sigurðarson (born 1982), Icelandic marketing director and lawyer, and magazine publisher

Icelandic masculine given names
Icelandic-language surnames